Gaetz Brook  is a rural community of the Halifax Regional Municipality in the Canadian province of Nova Scotia.
Gaetz Brook has a junior high school called Gaetz Brook Junior High for students in grades 7–9, and the students come from O'Connell Drive Elementary and Porter's Lake Elementary. They can also come from Atlanticview Elementary.

Gaetz Brook Greenway

In Spring 2020, SATA Trails opened the Gaetz Brook Greenway. The newly developed rail trail starts in Musquodoboit Harbour near the end of Highway 107 and ends on the East Chezzetcook Road. There are small connectors to the trail through the parking lot of the Gaetz Brook Junior High School, the parking lot of the Eastern Marine Legion 161 and Pine Hill Drive.

References
 Explore HRM
 Gaetz Brook

Communities in Halifax, Nova Scotia
General Service Areas in Nova Scotia